The plantar intercuneiform ligaments are fibrous bands that connect the plantar surfaces of adjacent cuneiform bones.

Ligaments of the lower limb